Tito Oro Nobili (23 March 1882, Perugia – 8 February 1967, Rome) was an Italian politician. He was one of the founders and main leaders of the Italian Socialist Party.

References

1867 births
1967 deaths
Italian Socialist Party politicians
Italian Aventinian secessionists